The Hon. Hugh Geoffrey Dickinson (born 17 November 1929) is an English clergyman who was Dean of Salisbury from 1986 until his retirement in 1996.

Early life
Dickinson is a younger son of Richard Sebastian Willoughby Dickinson DSO, only son of Willoughby Dickinson, 1st Baron Dickinson. His father was an officer of the Colonial Service, and his mother, Nancy Lovemore, was a sculptor.  He and his middle brother Peter Dickinson were born in Northern Rhodesia. The family returned to England in 1934, and his father died the next year. He was educated at Westminster School and Trinity College, Oxford, and in May 1944 was granted the rank of a baron's younger son.

Career
Dickinson was ordained in the Church of England in 1957, after a period of study at Ripon College Cuddesdon. He was a curate at St Michael's, Melksham, then chaplain at Trinity College, Cambridge, and  Winchester College. In 1969 he became Bishop Bardsley's Adviser for Adult Education in the Diocese of Coventry and was subsequently vicar of St Michael's, St Albans, from 1977 until 1986, when he was appointed as Dean of Salisbury. He retired in 1996.

Personal life
Dickinson married Jean Storey in June 1963 and they have two children: Teresa (born 1964) and Benjamin (born 1966).

References

1929 births
Living people
People educated at Westminster School, London
Alumni of Trinity College, Oxford
Alumni of Ripon College Cuddesdon
Deans of Salisbury